Colorado's 16th Senate district is one of 35 districts in the Colorado Senate. It has been represented by Democrat Chris Kolker since 2023. Prior to redistricting the district was represented by Democrat Tammy Story and Republican Tim Neville.

Geography
District 16 is based in the far western suburbs of Denver, covering all of Gilpin County and parts of Boulder County and Jefferson County, as well as the southwestern corner of Denver proper. Other communities in the district include Superior, Central City, Golden, Evergreen, Conifer, Genesee, Indian Hills, Kittredge, West Pleasant View, and portions of Columbine.

The district overlaps with Colorado's 1st, 2nd, and 7th congressional districts, and with the 1st, 13th, 22nd, 24th, 25th, and 33rd districts of the Colorado House of Representatives.

Recent election results
Colorado state senators are elected to staggered four-year terms. The old 16th district held elections in midterm years, but the new district drawn following the 2020 Census will hold elections in presidential years.

Following redistricting, Senator Tammy Story's home was drawn into the solidly Republican 4th district, and she is seeking a seat in the Colorado House of Representatives in 2022 instead. 27th district Senator Chris Kolker will represent the 16th district from 2022 onwards.

2018

2014

Federal and statewide results in District 16

References 

16
Boulder County, Colorado
Denver
Gilpin County, Colorado
Jefferson County, Colorado